Third County Courthouse may refer to any of numerous courthouses that were third-built in their county, including:

Old Marengo County Courthouse, Linden, Alabama
Christian County Courthouse (Illinois), Taylorville, Illinois
Third St. Joseph County Courthouse, South Bend, Indiana
Third Sarpy County Courthouse, Papillon, Nebraska
Third County Courthouse (Staten Island), New York City, New York
Clark County Courthouse (Ohio), Springfield, Ohio

See also
Old Third District Courthouse, New Bedford, Massachusetts
Jefferson Market Library, was Third Judicial District Courthouse, New York City, New York
Second County Courthouse (disambiguation)
Fourth County Courthouse (disambiguation)